The Levin House, in Hebrew Beit Levin - Tel Avivians gave it the nickname "the Castle" and later called it the Russian Embassy House - is a historic building located at 46 Rothschild Boulevard on the corner of Shadal Street in Tel Aviv, Israel, and is one of the city's best-known buildings.

Levin House is an eclectic building with some neoclassical influences, which is unique in central Tel Aviv. The building was designed in 1924 by architect Yehuda Magidovitch for a wealthy customer, Zvi Yaacov Levin and his family, and is inspired by the late 19th century Italian vacation homes, a distinctive pointy-roofed tower.

One of the more striking elements of the building is its pointy-roofed tower. During the building's rehabilitation, the crew discovered that the three parts of the tower could be opened by using a special mechanism, and create an opening over the staircase. The mechanism enabled furniture to be moved into the building. It may also have been used by the religiously observant Levine family to create a succah during the Feast of the Tabernacles.

History
The house was originally built for the Levin family. It later had several owners throughout the years and after the establishment of the State of Israel, housed the USSR Embassy, being known during those years as the Russian Embassy House. On the evening of February 9, 1953, the house was damaged by a bomb placed by three former Lehi activists. The event was used by the Soviet Union as an excuse for stopping diplomatic relations with Israel, claiming that the operation was backed by the Israeli government. Diplomatic relations were only renewed after Stalin's death in July 1953 (only to be discontinued again in 1967 after the Six-Day War and resumed by December 1991, as a result of Mikhail Gorbachev's Perestroika reform.)

Since the 1990s
After years of neglect, the building went through rehabilitation by architects Amnon Bar Or and Moti Bodek, along with engineer Shmaya Ben Avraham. The conservation was done alongside the construction on the adjacent Alrov Tower (built 1995–99), designed by architects Avraham Yaski and Yosi Sivan. This special construction project, which combines a historic reconstruction with an adjacent skyscraper, has encouraged similar projects nearby. Throughout the 1990s and until 2006, the building housed the offices and showrooms of Sotheby's Auction House, and was renamed Sotheby's House.

In 2006, the house was sold for over 35 million shekels to Gerry Schwartz and Heather Reisman and it is now called Heseg House after the Heseg foundation established by the couple. The house was donated to the philanthropic fund, and after another restoration is used for philanthropic activities, primarily by Heseg – a scholarship fund for former soldiers.

References

Sources

External links

Buildings and structures in Tel Aviv
Diplomatic buildings
Houses completed in 1924